Winfried is a masculine German given name. Notable people with the name include:

Winfried Berkemeier (born 1953), former German footballer
Winfried Bischoff (born 1941), German-British businessperson
Winfried Bönig (born 1959), German organist
Winfried Brugger (born 1950), German academic
Winfried Denk (born 1957), German physicist and neurobiologist
Winfried Glatzeder (born 1945), German television actor
Winfried Hassemer (1940–2014), German criminal law scientist
Winfried Klepsch (born 1956), retired West German long jumper
Winfried Kretschmann (born 1948), German politician 
Winfried Michel (born 1948), German recorder player, composer, and editor of music
Winfried Nachtwei (born 1946), German politician
W.G. Sebald (born 1944), German writer and academic (full name Winfried Georg Sebald)
Winfried Otto Schumann (1888–1974), German physicist
Winfried Schäfer (born 1950), German football manager and former player
Winfried Zillig (1905–1963), German composer, music theorist, and conductor
Saint Boniface (672–754), born Winfrid, Apostle of the Germans

German masculine given names